Thiotricha bullata is a moth of the family Gelechiidae. It was described by Edward Meyrick in 1904. It is found in Australia, where it has been recorded from New South Wales.

The forewings are whitish, thinly sprinkled with dark grey and with a large roundish dark grey spot in the middle of the disc, and a smaller one at two-thirds. The hindwings are whitish grey.

References

Moths described in 1904
Taxa named by Edward Meyrick
Thiotricha